The 1985 Campionati Internazionali di Sicilia, also known by its sponsored name Kim Top Line Trophy, was a men's tennis tournament played on outdoor clay courts in Palermo, Italy that was part of the 1985 Nabisco Grand Prix. It was the seventh edition of the tournament and took place from 9 September until 15 September 1985. Eighth-seeded Thierry Tulasne won the singles title.

Finals

Singles
 Thierry Tulasne defeated  Joakim Nyström 6–3, 6–1
 It was Tulasne's 2nd singles title of the year and the 3rd of his career.

Doubles
 Colin Dowdeswell /  Joakim Nyström defeated  Sergio Casal /  Emilio Sánchez 6–4, 6–7, 7–6

References

External links
 ITF tournament edition details

Campionati Internazionali di Sicilia
Campionati Internazionali di Sicilia
Campionati Internazionali di Sicilia